Guy Dufour (born February 9, 1946) is a Canadian retired professional ice hockey forward who played 83 games in the World Hockey Association (WHA) with the Quebec Nordiques over parts of two seasons.

External links
 

1946 births
Canadian ice hockey forwards
French Quebecers
Ice hockey people from Quebec
Living people
Montreal Junior Canadiens players
Muskegon Mohawks players
Peterborough Petes (ice hockey) players
Providence Reds players
Quebec Aces (AHL) players
Quebec Nordiques (WHA) players
Roanoke Valley Rebels (EHL) players